Chengxi District is one of four districts of the prefecture-level city of Xining, the capital of Qinghai Province, Northwest China.

It covers the western part of Xining's built-up conurbation. It has over 200 000 residents (2004). Ethnically, most are Han; there are also Hui, Tibetan, Tujia, etc. - 26 in all.

Administration
District executive, legislature and judiciary are in the Xiguan Avenue Subdistrict, together with the CPC and PSB branches. (Executive or People's Government is addressed : May Fourth Avenue, 810001).

Subdistricts
Aside of Xiguan Avenue, the district oversees another five Street Committees and one Town:
 Guchengtai (古城台街道)
 Hutai (虎台街道)
 Shengli Rd (胜利路街道)
 Nanchuan West Rd (南川西路街道)
 Pengjiazhai Town (彭家寨镇)

See also

 List of administrative divisions of Qinghai

Notes and references

County-level divisions of Qinghai
Xining